Inya is a rural locality (a selo) and the administrative center of Inskoy Selsoviet, Shelabolikhinsky District, Altai Krai, Russia. The population was 628 as of 2013. There are 7 streets.

Geography 
Inya is located 14 km north of Shelabolikha (the district's administrative centre) by road. Shelabolikha is the nearest rural locality.

References 

Rural localities in Shelabolikhinsky District